The BYU Cougars college football team represents Brigham Young University (BYU) in the Big 12 Conference (Big 12). The Cougars competes as part of the NCAA Division I Football Bowl Subdivision. The program has had 14 head coaches since it began play during the 1922 season. Since December 2015, Kalani Sitake has served as head coach at BYU.

Five coaches have led BYU in postseason bowl games: Tommy Hudspeth, LaVell Edwards, Gary Crowton, Bronco Mendenhall, and Kalani Sitake. Four of those coaches also won conference championships: Hudspeth captured one and Edwards 18 as a member of the Western Athletic Conference; and Edwards and Crowton captured one and Mendenhall two as a member of the Mountain West Conference.

Edwards is the leader in seasons coached, games won, and winning percentage, with 257 victories (0.716 winning percentage) during his 29 years with the program. Hal Mitchell has the lowest winning percentage of those who have coached more than one game, with 0.267. Of the 14 different head coaches who have led the Cougars, Edwards has been inducted into the College Football Hall of Fame.

Key

Coaches

Notes

References

BYU Cougars
BYU Cougars football coaches